was a  after Kanna and before Eiso. This period spanned the years from April 987 through August 988.

Change of era
 January 2, 987 : The new era name was created to mark an event or a number of events. The previous era ended and a new one commenced in Kanna 3, on the 5th day of the 4th month in the year 987.

Events of Eien era
 987 (Eien 1, 10th month): The emperor paid a visit to the home of Fujiwara no Kaneie.
 987 (Eien 1, 11th month): The emperor visited Iwashimizu Hachiman-gū.
 987 (Eien 1, 12th month): The emperor visited the Kamo Shrine.
 988 (Eien 2, 8th month): Fujiwara no Kaneie invited a number of courtiers to his home where he entertained them in a grand manner.
 988 (Eien 2, 11th month): The emperor visited the home of Kaneie to join him in celebrating the courtier's 60th birthday.

Notes

References
 Brown, Delmer M. and Ichirō Ishida, eds. (1979).  Gukanshō: The Future and the Past. Berkeley: University of California Press. ;  OCLC 251325323
 Nussbaum, Louis-Frédéric and Käthe Roth. (2005).  Japan encyclopedia. Cambridge: Harvard University Press. ;  OCLC 58053128
 Titsingh, Isaac. (1834). Nihon Odai Ichiran; ou,  Annales des empereurs du Japon.  Paris: Royal Asiatic Society, Oriental Translation Fund of Great Britain and Ireland. OCLC 5850691
 Varley, H. Paul. (1980). A Chronicle of Gods and Sovereigns: Jinnō Shōtōki of Kitabatake Chikafusa. New York: Columbia University Press. ;  OCLC 6042764

External links
 National Diet Library, "The Japanese Calendar" -- historical overview plus illustrative images from library's collection

Japanese eras
10th century in Japan